Pierre Henry (born March 10, 1952) is a Canadian former professional ice hockey centre who played in the World Hockey Association (WHA). Henry played part of the 1972–73 WHA season with the Philadelphia Blazers.

Career statistics

References

External links

1952 births
Canadian ice hockey centres
Drummondville Rangers players
Living people
Philadelphia Blazers players
Philadelphia Firebirds (NAHL) players
Roanoke Valley Rebels (EHL) players
Roanoke Valley Rebels (SHL) players
Ice hockey people from Montreal